The 2014 FIM Moto2 World Championship was a part of the 66th F.I.M. Road Racing World Championship season. Pol Espargaró was the reigning series champion, but did not contest the season as he joined the series' premier class, MotoGP.

Scoring a record tally of points for the intermediate class, with 346, Marc VDS Racing Team rider Esteve Rabat wound up as the series champion, finishing 57 points clear of his teammate Mika Kallio. Rabat also set records for pole positions with 11, and tied the record for podiums with 14 – including 7 wins – matching Marc Márquez in the  campaign. Kallio, a three-time winner, sealed the runner-up position in the championship after a collision with his closest challenger for the position, Maverick Viñales, in the final round of the season in Valencia. Both riders retired from the race as a result of the incident, giving Kallio the position by 15 points. Viñales' performances – his best results being four victories – were easily good enough for him to finish as the highest placed rookie in the championship standings, finishing almost 200 points clear of the next best rookie, his Paginas Amarillas HP 40 teammate Luis Salom, who finished eighth in the championship.

Fourth place in the championship was taken by Interwetten Sitag rider Thomas Lüthi, who won late season races in Japan and Valencia; the latter coming after Rabat was slow coming off the final corner of the race. He finished just ahead of compatriot Dominique Aegerter, who for the Technomag  team, achieved his first Grand Prix victory during the 2014 season. Having scored his first pole position in qualifying, Aegerter took his maiden victory in his 129th start, fending off Kallio's advances in the closing stages. The only other race victor was Anthony West for the QMMF Racing Team, winning a wet race at Assen; it was his second race win at the track, having triumphed in similar conditions in 2003. Riding a Speed Up, it was the only time a Suter or Kalex did not win a race throughout the season. Kalex dominated the constructors' championship, amassing 430 points out of a maximum total of 450.

Calendar
The Fédération Internationale de Motocyclisme released a 19-race provisional calendar on 2 October 2013. The calendar was updated on 13 December 2013 and again on 24 February 2014, resulting in an 18-race calendar.

The 2014 calendar originally saw the addition of two South American races, the series' first visit to the continent since 2004. A race in Argentina at the newly upgraded Autódromo Termas de Río Hondo is scheduled for 27 April and a race in Brazil at the Autódromo Internacional Nelson Piquet in Brasilia was scheduled for 28 September, but the latter was subsequently removed from the calendar. The round at Motorland Aragón was also moved back a week, filling the date originally scheduled for Brazil.

 ‡ = Night race
 †† = Saturday race

Teams and riders
A provisional entry list was released by the Fédération Internationale de Motocyclisme on 20 November 2013. An updated entry list was released on 14 January 2014. The final entry list was released on 28 February 2014. All Moto2 competitors raced with an identical CBR600RR inline-four engine developed by Honda. Teams competed with tyres supplied by Dunlop.

Rider changes
 Esteve Rabat joined Marc VDS Racing Team, replacing Scott Redding who moved up to MotoGP with GO&FUN Gresini.
 Maverick Viñales moved up to Moto2 with Pons HP 40, filling the seat vacated by Pol Espargaró who moved up to MotoGP with Monster Yamaha Tech 3.

Results and standings

Grands Prix

Riders' standings
Scoring system
Points were awarded to the top fifteen finishers. A rider had to finish the race to earn points.

Constructors' standings
Points were awarded to the top fifteen finishers. A rider had to finish the race to earn points.

 Each constructor got the same number of points as their best placed rider in each race.

Notes

References

External links
 The official website of Grand Prix motorcycle racing

Moto2
Grand Prix motorcycle racing seasons